Below are the squads for the Football at the 2018 Mediterranean Games, hosted in Tarragona, Spain, and took place between 22 and 30 June 2018. Teams were national U18 sides.

Group A

Algeria
Head coach: Boualem Charef

Bosnia and Herzegovina
Head coach: Mirza Varešanović

Spain
Head coach: Luis de la Fuente

Group B

Italy 

Head coach: Daniele Franceschini

Libya

Morocco

Group C

France

Greece

Turkey

References

Squads
Mediterranean Games football squads